is a Japanese engineer and businessman, who has been the chief executive officer of Honda Motor Co., Ltd., from June 2015 - April 2021 and was succeeded by Toshihiro Mibe. Prior to this, Hachigo was a managing officer at Honda, and started his career at Honda in 1982 as a chassis engineer. As CEO, Hachigo sought to streamline the manufacturing process by merging certain operations between motorcycles and cars, and while also lowering the costs of production by consolidating factories at home and abroad involving the budget. Hachigo is currently a member of the company board.

References

1959 births
Living people
Honda people
Japanese chief executives
20th-century Japanese businesspeople
21st-century Japanese businesspeople